Jonathan dos Santos Ramírez (born 26 April 1990) is a Mexican professional footballer who plays as a defensive midfielder for Liga MX club América.

Early life
Born in Monterrey, Mexico, Jonathan was competing along with his brother Giovani in a youth tournament in France, where he was spotted by FC Barcelona scouts who decided to bring him and his brother to La Masia for a trial.

Club career

Barcelona

2008–09 season
In the 2008–09 season, Dos Santos was in Juvenil A where he was captain of the team. During that same season, he obtained a Spanish passport and thereby acquired Citizenship of the European Union, which enabled him to play in the first team.

2009–10 season
In the summer of 2009, Dos Santos was selected by FC Barcelona B manager Luis Enrique to form part of the second team. Subsequently, Pep Guardiola called him up to the first team during pre-season in England and the tour in the United States. On 15 August 2009, Dos Santos was called up for his first official game with the first team in the Supercopa de España against Athletic Bilbao, although he was eventually ruled out and saw the game as a spectator. He made his debut with Barcelona B on 5 September 2009 against Mallorca B. The match finished in a 1–1 draw. Jonathan made his debut for Barcelona on 28 October 2009, coming on as a substitute for Seydou Keita in the 80th minute in an away Copa del Rey match against Cultural Leonesa, which Barcelona won 2–0.
He made his Champions League debut for Barcelona on 24 November 2009 against Internazionale in a 2–0 win at the Camp Nou when he replaced Andrés Iniesta in the 92nd minute. Due to the lengthy 2009–10 season, many Barcelona first-team players were given breaks towards the end of the year. This meant the first team was going to be a few men short, and hence four Barça B players were called up by Guardiola on 29 December 2009. Among these four were Dos Santos, Thiago, Gai Assulin and Víctor Vázquez. His La Liga debut came on 2 January 2010 when he started against Villarreal CF before being substituted by Iniesta in the 60th minute.

2010–11 season
Dos Santos was called up by Pep Guardiola to the Barcelona first team during pre-season along with other players from Barcelona B. In the first three matches, Guardiola played him as defensive midfielder, a position he had never played before. Nevertheless, Dos Santos said, "I've felt comfortable in this position."

2011–12 season
On 26 July 2011, Dos Santos started, and scored a goal, in the 2–2 draw against Sport Club Internacional in the 2011 Audi Cup. The match went to a penalty shootout, where he scored as well. Barcelona advanced to the final, where they beat FC Bayern Munich 2–0. He was part of the starting line-up in both matches, though he played at right back in the final. He made his season debut on 29 August in the 5–0 home win against Villarreal, coming in as a substitute for Cesc Fàbregas in the 70th minute.

On 24 November 2011, Dos Santos signed a contract extension which would keep him at Barcelona until 2015. On 6 December, he appeared in the starting squad and played 58 minutes against FC BATE Borisov for the 2011–12 UEFA Champions League group stage match.

2012–13 season
Despite rumours of a transfer to other Spanish clubs such as Real Betis and Málaga CF, and Sevilla FC, newly appointed coach Tito Vilanova officially called up Dos Santos to Barcelona's first team squad, handing him the number 12 shirt. On 6 April 2013, against RCD Mallorca, he came on as a substitute for Andrés Iniesta in the 50th minute and competed against his brother Giovani dos Santos.

Villarreal
On 9 July 2014, Dos Santos signed a five-year deal with Villarreal, and going to play with his brother Giovani. On 21 December, Dos Santos scored his first La Liga goal in a 3–0 victory against Deportivo de La Coruña.

LA Galaxy
On 27 July 2017, MLS club LA Galaxy announced the signing of Dos Santos as a Designated Player, reuniting him with his brother, Giovani, at the American club. Villarreal sold Jonathan for a fee reportedly around €5–6 million.

América
On 23 December 2021, Dos Santos joined Club América on a free transfer after Los Angeles Galaxy parted ways with the player in late November.

International career

Dos Santos made his senior national team debut in a friendly against Colombia on 30 September 2009. He was substituted for Patricio Araujo in the 72nd minute; Colombia won the game 2–1. This meant that he represented his national team before debuting for his club team.

On 3 March 2010, Dos Santos played 61 minutes against New Zealand. During the match, off a corner from Cuauhtémoc Blanco, the ball rolled towards him and he shot from outside the box but hit the crossbar. Dos Santos was left out of Mexico's 23-man final squad for the 2010 FIFA World Cup.

In May 2011, Dos Santos was left out of the 2011 Gold Cup final squad. On 24 May 2011, he was called up to play the Copa América. He was subsequently dismissed from the team due to indiscipline.

On 29 February 2012, Dos Santos returned to the Mexico national team for a friendly against Colombia in Miami, Florida, in which they lost 2–0.

In November 2014, after a two-year absence with the national team, Dos Santos was called up by coach Miguel Herrera for the friendly matches against the Netherlands and Belarus on 12 and 18 November, respectively.

In 2015, Dos Santos was called up to Mexico's friendly against Ecuador and Paraguay. Jonathan did not start nor play in Ecuador's friendly, but he started in Paraguay's friendly which led to a 1–0 win against them at Arrowhead Stadium in Kansas City, Missouri. He was called back up for two friendlies against Costa Rica and Honduras where both matches were drawn, and he was also called up for the 2015 Gold Cup, starting in every match as Mexico won the tournament.

In June 2018, Dos Santos was named in Mexico's 23-man squad for the World Cup in Russia.

On 26 March 2019, Dos Santos scored his first ever senior international goal, opening the scoring in a 4–2 friendly win over Paraguay. In June 2019, he was named in Mexico's 23-man squad for the 2019 Gold Cup. He scored the lone goal in a 1–0 victory over the United States in the final. He was subsequently listed in the tournament's Best XI.

Style of play
Dos Santos is described as a versatile midfielder, with LA Galaxy he often played as a holding midfielder. He is known for his work rate, technical acuity, defensive tenacity, vision and ability to create space and opportunities for teammates.

Personal life
Jonathan is the son of former Afro-Brazilian footballer Zizinho, who played for the Mexican football clubs América and León in the late 1980s. His mother, Liliana Ramírez, is a Mexican national; two brothers and two half-brothers – the elder, Éder dos Santos, who used to play for América as a defensive midfielder before retiring, and Giovani dos Santos, who most recently played for Club América.

Career statistics

Club

International

Scores and results list Mexico's goal tally first, score column indicates score after each dos Santos goal.

Honours
Barcelona
La Liga: 2009–10, 2010–11, 2012–13
Copa del Rey: 2011–12
Supercopa de España: 2009, 2010, 2011, 2013
UEFA Champions League: 2010–11
UEFA Super Cup: 2009, 2011
FIFA Club World Cup: 2009, 2011

Mexico
CONCACAF Gold Cup: 2015, 2019
CONCACAF Cup: 2015

Individual
CONCACAF Gold Cup Best XI: 2019
MLS All-Star: 2018, 2019

References

External links
Villarreal official profile 

1990 births
Living people
Mexican people of Brazilian descent
Sportspeople from Monterrey
Footballers from Nuevo León
Association football midfielders
FC Barcelona Atlètic players
FC Barcelona players
Villarreal CF players
LA Galaxy players
Club América footballers
Segunda División players
La Liga players
Major League Soccer players
Designated Players (MLS)
UEFA Champions League winning players
Mexico international footballers
2015 CONCACAF Gold Cup players
2017 FIFA Confederations Cup players
2018 FIFA World Cup players
2019 CONCACAF Gold Cup players
2021 CONCACAF Gold Cup players
CONCACAF Gold Cup-winning players
Mexican expatriate footballers
Mexican expatriate sportspeople in Spain
Expatriate footballers in Spain
Mexican expatriate sportspeople in the United States
Expatriate soccer players in the United States
Mexican footballers